Vukile Mngqibisa is a defender. He plays for AmaZulu in the South African National First Division.

References

External links

Living people
1987 births
Association football defenders
South African soccer players
Polokwane City F.C. players
University of Pretoria F.C. players
Sivutsa Stars F.C. players
AmaZulu F.C. players